Sky Jack (foaled April 18, 1996 in California) is a retired American thoroughbred racehorse.

Background
Bred and raced by Rene and Margie Lambert, he was sired by Jaklin Klugman and out of the mare Sky Captive, a daughter of the 1986 Breeders' Cup Classic winner Skywalker.

Racing career
After a successful season in 2000, Sky Jack incurred a knee injury that required multiple surgeries. In addition, he suffered from bouts of colic, all of which kept him out of racing until September 2002. Having recovered from life-threatening illnesses, the gelding enjoyed his most successful season, winning the Grade II Mervyn Leroy Handicap and the Grade I Hollywood Gold Cup. In winning the 2003 Longacres Mile Handicap, Sky Jack set the record for both the fastest time and widest margin of victory.

Retirement
Due to a recurring knee problem, Sky Jack was retired in November 2003 to his owners' farm near Temecula, California. Suffering from malignant melanoma, on June 30, 2016 Sky Jack was humanely euthanized.

References

1996 racehorse births
Thoroughbred family 3-m
Racehorses bred in California
Racehorses trained in the United States
American Grade 1 Stakes winners